This article lists Tehran's Friday Prayer Imams that were appointed after the Iranian Revolution of 1979. It contains both permanent and temporary Tehran's Friday Prayer Imams. The current Imam is Supreme Leader of Iran Sayyid Ali Khamenei, who also appoints temporary Imams. Mohammad Emami-Kashani, Ahmad Khatami, Kazem Seddiqi, Ali Movahedi-Kermani, Mohammad-Hassan Aboutorabi Fard and Mohammad Javad Haj Ali Akbari are current temporary Imams.

Imams

Post-1979

Temporary Imams

See also 
 Friday prayer in Shia Islam
 List of provincial representatives appointed by Supreme Leader of Iran

References 

Imams

Friday Prayer Imams
Friday Prayer Imams